Dambadondogiin Baatarjav (born June 2, 1961) is a Mongolian professional archer. He competed for Mongolia in archery at the 2006 Asian Games. Baatarjav finished the 2006 Asian Games with a total of 1167 points compared to the 1332 points of South Korean Im Dong Hyun.

He won Mongolia's first-ever medal and first-ever gold medal in the Paralympic Games by winning the men's individual recurve standing event at the 2008 Beijing Paralympic Games.

References

1961 births
Living people
Mongolian male archers
Paralympic archers of Mongolia
Paralympic gold medalists for Mongolia
Paralympic medalists in archery
Archers at the 2008 Summer Paralympics
Medalists at the 2008 Summer Paralympics
Asian Games competitors for Mongolia
Archers at the 2006 Asian Games
20th-century Mongolian people